These lists display stories in anime and manga according to the role yuri plays in them. The first list contains examples of yuri works as an explicit or central theme, in which interpersonal attraction between females and the incorporation of lesbian themes play a central narrative plot in their genre or storylines. Such elements are labeled by publishers as yuri, and may include a lesbian character as the protagonist or a supporting character, or explorations of sexuality or gender that deviate from the hetero-normative. The second list contains examples of yuri works as a secondary or peripheral storyline, such as a romantic subplot, the presence of an important female character who is incidentally either lesbian, bisexual or other sapphic sexuality, as well as a noticeable amount of homoerotic-related implicit subtext or casual lgbt female representation.

Yuri as a central or explicit element

Yuri as a secondary or peripheral element

Yuri manga published in other languages

References

Lists of anime by genre
Lists of manga by genre